Xyletinus is a genus of death-watch and spider beetles in the family Ptinidae and subfamily Xyletininae.

Species
These 51 species belong to the genus Xyletinus:

 Xyletinus ater
 Xyletinus balcanicus Gottwald, 1977 g
 Xyletinus bicolor White, 1977 i c g
 Xyletinus brevis (White, 1960) i c g
 Xyletinus bucephaloides Reitter, 1901 g
 Xyletinus bucephalus (Illiger, 1807) g
 Xyletinus californicus White, 1977 i c g
 Xyletinus carinatus White, 1977 i c g
 Xyletinus confusus White, 1977 i c g
 Xyletinus cylindricus Kofler, 1970 g
 Xyletinus distinguendus Kofler, 1970 g
 Xyletinus excellens Kofler, 1970 g
 Xyletinus fasciatus White, 1962 i c g b
 Xyletinus fibyensis Lundblad, 1949 g
 Xyletinus fimicola (Wollaston, 1861) g
 Xyletinus formosus Mannerheim, 1849 g
 Xyletinus fucatus LeConte, 1865 i c g
 Xyletinus gracilipes Fall, 1905 i c g
 Xyletinus hanseni Jansson, 1947 g
 Xyletinus interpositus Gottwald, 1977 g
 Xyletinus kofleri Gottwald, 1977 g
 Xyletinus laticollis (Duftschmid, 1825) g
 Xyletinus latiusculus Kofler, 1970 g
 Xyletinus lecerfi Kocher, 1956 g
 Xyletinus leprieuri Chobaut, 1894 g
 Xyletinus longitarsis Jansson, 1942 g
 Xyletinus lugubris LeConte, 1878 i c g b
 Xyletinus maculatus Kiesenwetter, 1877 g
 Xyletinus marmoratus Pic, 1911 g
 Xyletinus moraviensis Gottwald, 1977 g
 Xyletinus muehlei Gottwald, 1983 g
 Xyletinus obsoletus White, 1973 i c g
 Xyletinus ocularis Reitter, 1901 g
 Xyletinus ornatus
 Xyletinus pallens Germar, 1824 g
 Xyletinus parvus White, 1977 i c g
 Xyletinus pectinatus
 Xyletinus pectiniferus Fairmaire, 1879 g
 Xyletinus planicollis Lohse, 1957 g
 Xyletinus pseudoblongulus Gottwald, 1977 g
 Xyletinus puberulus (Boheman, 1858) i c g
 Xyletinus pubescens LeConte, 1878 i c g b
 Xyletinus rotundicollis White, 1977 i c g
 Xyletinus ruficollis Gebler, 1833 g
 Xyletinus sanguineocinctus Fairmaire, 1859 g
 Xyletinus sareptanus
 Xyletinus subrotundatus Lareynie, 1852 g
 Xyletinus tremulicola Y.Kangas, 1958 g
 Xyletinus vaederoeensis Lundberg, 1969 g
 Xyletinus wollastoni Gottwald, 1977 g

Data sources: i = ITIS, c = Catalogue of Life, g = GBIF, b = Bugguide.net

References

External links

 

Ptinidae